Boneh-ye Abbas (also Romanized as Boneh-ye ‘Abbās; also known as Boneh Ghabbās and Gabbās) is a village in Soltanabad Rural District, in the Central District of Ramhormoz County, Khuzestan Province, Iran. At the 2006 census, its population was 437, in 87 families.

References 

Populated places in Ramhormoz County